Truter and Another v Deysel is an important case in South African law, with particular resonance in the area of civil procedure and medical malpractice. It is also frequently quoted or invoked for its definition of "cause of action." It was heard in the Supreme Court of Appeal by Harms JA, Zulman JA, Navsa JA, Mthiyane JA and Van Heerden JA on 24 February 2006; judgment was delivered on 17 March. Counsel for the appellants was JG Dickerson SC; AC Oosthuizen SC appeared for the respondent. The case was an appeal from a decision in the Cape Provincial Division by Mlonzi AJ.

The case turned on "the crisp question" of when exactly, in terms of the Prescription Act, the period of prescription commences. Deysel's claim was based on delict. Under section 12 of the Act, prescription begins to run only from the time at which creditor acquires knowledge, or is deemed to have acquired knowledge, of "the facts from which the debt arises." The creditor acquires a complete cause of action for the recovery of debt when he is in possession of the entire set of facts upon which he relies to prove his claim. The court held that the cause of action is complete as soon as the creditor sustains some harm; knowledge of fault or unlawfulness is not required. Expert opinion (to the effect that the defendants' conduct was negligent) did not constitute a fact, but was rather evidence. Prescription accordingly commenced to run as soon as the creditor sustained harm, and not only when he secured expert opinion that defendants' conduct was negligent.

Facts 
The respondent (plaintiff a quo) instituted action in the High Court against the appellants (defendants a quo) for damages for personal injury allegedly sustained by him as a result of the negligence of the defendants in their performance on him of certain medical and surgical procedures. The defendants raised a special plea of prescription. It appeared that, although the procedures had been performed on the plaintiff in 1993, it was only in early 2000 that he managed to secure medical opinion to the effect that the defendants had conducted themselves negligently and, for that reason, that summons was issued only in April 2000. The question which fell for determination by the High Court was the time at which the period of prescription in respect of the plaintiff's claim had commenced to run. The High Court dismissed the special plea, finding that the period of prescription had commenced running only when the plaintiff had managed to secure medical opinion to the effect that the defendants had been negligent.

Judgment 
Van Heerden JA held—and Harms JA, Zulman JA, Navsa JA and Mthiyane JA concurred—that, under section 11(d) of the Prescription Act, the plaintiff's claim was subject to a three-year extinctive period of prescription. He held, further, that under section 12 of the Act prescription of a debt (which included a delictual debt) began running when the debt became due: A debt became due when the creditor acquired knowledge of the facts from which the debt arose; in other words, when the creditor acquired a complete cause of action for the recovery of the debt, or when the entire set of facts upon which he relied to prove his claim was in place.

The court found that, in a delictual claim, the requirements of fault and unlawfulness were not factual ingredients of the cause of action; they were, rather, legal conclusions to be drawn from the facts. For the purposes of prescription, "cause of action" meant every fact which it was necessary for the plaintiff to prove in order to succeed in his claim, although it did not comprise every piece of evidence which was necessary to prove those facts. An expert opinion, to the effect that certain conduct had been negligent, was not itself a fact, but, rather, evidence.

The plaintiff in the present case, to the mind of Van Heerden JA, had not lacked capacity to appreciate that a wrong had been done to him. The running of prescription could therefore not be delayed on that ground. In accordance with the "once and for all" rule, a plaintiff's cause of action is complete as soon as he sustains some damage, not only in respect of the damage actually sustained, but also in respect of any damage yet to be sustained. The court found that all of the facts and information in respect of the operations performed on the plaintiff by the defendants had been known, or had been readily accessible, to him and his legal representatives as early as 1994 or 1995. Accordingly, the appeal and the special plea had to be upheld, and the decision in the Cape Provincial Division, in Deysel v Truter and Another reversed.

See also 
 Civil procedure in South Africa
 Law of South Africa

References

Books 
 Joubert (ed) Law of South Africa vol 21 (1st reissue).
 Loubser Extinctive Prescription.
 Visser and Potgieter The Law of Damages 2 ed.

Case law 
 Bentley v Bristol and Western Health Authority [1990] 2 Med LR (QB).
 Buchner and Another v Johannesburg Consolidated Investment Co Ltd 1995 (1) SA 215 (T).
 Cape Town Municipality v Paine 1923 AD 207.
 Cape Town Municipality and Another v Allianz Insurance Co Ltd 1990 (1) SA 311 (C).
 Castell v De Greef 1993 (3) SA 501 (C).
 Coetzee v SA Railways and Harbours 1933 CPD 565.
 Deloitte Haskins & Sells Consultants (Pty) Ltd v Bowthorpe Hellerman Deutsch (Pty) Ltd 1991 (1) SA 525 (A).
 Deysel v Truter and Another 2005 (5) SA 598 (C).
 Dobbie v Medway Health Authority [1994] 5 Med LR.
 Drennan Maud & Partners v Pennington Town Board 1998 (3) SA 200 (SCA).
 Evins v Shield Insurance Co Ltd 1980 (2) SA 814 (A).
 Halford v Brookes [1991] WLR 428.
 McKenzie v Farmers' Co-operative Meat Industries Ltd 1922 AD 16.
 Mkhatswa v Minister of Defence 2000 (1) SA 1104 (SCA).
 Nash v Eli Lilly [1991] 2 Med LR 169.
 Nedcor Bank Bpk v Regering van die Republiek van Suid-Afrika 2001 (1) SA 987 (SCA).
 Oliff v Minnie 1953 (1) SA 1 (A).
 Oslo Land Co Ltd v The Union Government 1938 AD 584.
 Pringle v Administrator, Transvaal 1990 (2) SA 379 (W).
 Prinsloo v Woolbrokers Federation Ltd 1955 (2) SA 298 (N).
 S v Kramer and Another 1987 (1) SA 887 (W).
 Stephen v Riverside Health Authority [1990] 1 Med LR 261 (QB).
 Van Staden v Fourie 1989 (3) SA 200 (A).
 Van Wyk v Lewis 1924 AD 438.
 Van Zijl v Hoogenhout 2005 (2) SA 93 (SCA).
 Wilsher v Essex Area Health Authority (1987) QB 730.

Statutes 
 English Limitation Act of 1980.
 Prescription Act 68 of 1969.

Notes 

2006 in South African law
2006 in case law
Supreme Court of Appeal of South Africa cases